Jerry Brandt (January 29, 1938 – January 16, 2021) was an American entrepreneur, impresario, agent, manager, promoter, and club owner who was active since the 1960s. He is known for discovering Carly Simon and serving as her first manager, as well as for his work with Lori Petty.

Life and career 
Born in Bensonhurst, Brooklyn, Brandt served in the army and afterwards first worked as a messenger in the mailroom at the William Morris Agency.  Within a few years, he moved up the ranks and became head of the pop music division. While working at William Morris, he discovered Chubby Checker, booked acts like The Beach Boys and Sonny & Cher, and brought The Rolling Stones to the USA. He also handled Sam Cooke,
Dick Clark, and Muhammad Ali for theatrical events. In the 1970s, he managed glam rock artist Jobriath Boone, and in 2012, appeared in the documentary Jobriath A.D..

Contemporaneous with his management work, Brandt also opened, owned, and managed major music venues such as The Electric Circus (1967), The Ritz, and Spo-Dee-O-Dee, a Blues Club. In 1970 he left the Electric Circus and moved to Los Angeles where he opened the Paradise Ballroom with legendary financier Bernie Cornfeld. Brandt produced the legendary flop Broadway musical Got Tu Go Disco, which closed in 1979 after nine previews and eight performances.

In 1992, along with Ron Delsener, Robin Leach, and Bob Krasnow, Brandt opened the Italian restaurant "Italica" at 220 East 46th St. which introduced "pizza by the meter."

Death 
Brandt died from COVID-19 and pneumonia-related causes in Miami Beach, Florida, during the COVID-19 pandemic in Florida. He was 82 years old.

References

External links
 Jerry Brandt - A Helluva Life - book homepage.
 Jerry Brandt "It's A Short Walk From Brooklyn, If You Run" Presentation Video trailer for the book.
 Carly Simon for Brandtworks Records
 New York Magazine article June 25, 1979
 Jerry Brandt, Whose Music Clubs Captured a Moment, Dies at 82 New York Times Obituary, Neil Genzlinger, Jan. 28, 2021

1938 births
2021 deaths
American music managers
People from Bensonhurst, Brooklyn
Deaths from the COVID-19 pandemic in Florida